Hisey is a surname. Notable people with the surname include:

Dennis Hisey, American politician
Rob Hisey (born 1984), Canadian ice hockey player

See also
Hosey

Americanized surnames
German-language surnames